Novaḱe is a village in the municipality of Bogovinje, North Macedonia.

Demographics
As of the 2021 census, Novaḱe had 174 residents with the following ethnic composition:
Albanians 167
Persons for whom data are taken from administrative sources 7

According to the 2002 census, the village had a total of 304 inhabitants. Ethnic groups in the village include:
Albanians 304

References

External links

Villages in Bogovinje Municipality
Albanian communities in North Macedonia